Abtaa (transliteration: Ibṭaʿ, also spelled Ibta or Obtei'a) is a town in southern Syria, administratively part of the Daraa District in the Daraa Governorate. Nearby localities include Da'el to the south, Khirbet Ghazaleh to the southeast, Namer to the east, Qarfa to the northeast and al-Shaykh Maskin to the north. According to the Syria Central Bureau of Statistics Abtaa had a population of 14,283.

History
Abtaa dates back to antiquity, having been mentioned in pre-Islamic Syriac texts.

In 1596 Abtaa appeared in the Ottoman tax registers  as Bita''' and was part of the nahiya of Bani Malik al-Asraf in the Sanjak Hauran. It had an entirely Muslim population consisting of 44 households and 20 bachelors. The villagers paid a fixed tax rate of 40% on various agricultural products, including   wheat, barley, summer crops, goats and beehives;  a total of 5,000  akçe.

In 1838 it was noted as a Muslim village, situated in the Nukrah'' district, south of Al-Shaykh Maskin. In the 1850s the Western traveler Josias Leslie Porter noted that Abtaa contained a number of large "old houses of basalt, and a few broken columns."

References

Bibliography

External links
 Map of town, Google Maps
 Cheik Meskin-map; 21L

Populated places in Daraa District